Tommy Doyle (born May 6, 1998) is an American football offensive tackle for the Buffalo Bills of the National Football League (NFL). He played college football at Miami (OH) and was drafted by the Bills in the fifth round of the 2021 NFL Draft.

College career

Doyle was ranked as a threestar recruit by 247Sports.com coming out of high school. He committed to Miami (OH) on June 17, 2015.

Professional career

Doyle was drafted by the Buffalo Bills with the 161st pick of the 2021 NFL Draft on May 1, 2021. On May 13, 2021, Doyle signed his four-year rookie contract with Buffalo. On January 15, 2022, Doyle scored his first NFL touchdown, catching a one-yard pass from Josh Allen in the Bills' 47–17 win over the New England Patriots in the Wild Card round of the 2021–22 NFL playoffs.

On September 27, 2022, Doyle was placed on season-ending injured reserve after suffering a torn ACL against the Miami Dolphins in Week 3.

References

External links
Miami(OH) bio

Living people
Buffalo Bills players
Miami RedHawks football players
Players of American football from Minnesota
Sportspeople from Edina, Minnesota
1998 births
American football offensive linemen